Tahora is a small settlement located in the Manawatū-Whanganui Region in the North Island of New Zealand along the Stratford–Okahukura railway line and State Highway 43 between Stratford and Taumarunui. It was the location of an annual folk music festival for 30 years. Tahora is located in the Stratford District.

Further reading

Music

 This is a 2-CD collection, featuring performers and songs from the 21st Tahora Folk Festival.

. This is a brief video cassette chronicling the 2000–2001 Tahora Folk Festival: dedicated to the memory of Alan Muggeridge, Taranaki musician /luthier /song writer.

People

There is a series of interviews conducted with a local Tahora identity: and CD copies are held at Puke Ariki in New Plymouth. The extent of these interviews can be ascertained at

Schools

Stratford District, New Zealand
Populated places in Manawatū-Whanganui